The Art of Crying is a 2006 Danish tragicomedy directed by Peter Schønau Fog. It stars  and Jesper Asholt in a harsh tale about an 11-year-old boy's struggle to hold intact his bizarre family with its abusive father, mother in denial, and rebellious sister during the social unrest of the early 1970s.

The film received both the Bodil and Robert awards for Best Danish Film, and The Nordic Council Film Prize.

Cast 
 
 Jesper Asholt as Father
  as Mother
 Julie Kolbech as Sanne (as Julie Kolbeck)
  as Asger
  as Grandmother
  as Aunt Didde
 Lene Tiemroth as Psychiatrist
 Bjarne Henriksen as Budde
 Sune Thomsen as Per
  as Dr. Madsen
  as Mrs. Budde

See also 
 List of Danish submissions for the Academy Award for Best Foreign Language Film

References

External links 
 
 The Danish Film Institute (In Danish)
 

2006 comedy-drama films
2006 films
Best Danish Film Bodil Award winners
Best Danish Film Robert Award winners
Danish comedy-drama films
2000s Danish-language films